The MLW National Openweight Championship is a professional wrestling championship created and promoted by the American professional wrestling promotion Major League Wrestling (MLW). The title was unveiled on April 18, 2019. The title's openweight nature, a division more common in Japanese professional wrestling, means that both heavyweight and middleweight wrestlers are eligible to challenge for it.

History

On April 18, 2019, Major League Wrestling (MLW) announced the creation of the MLW National Openweight Championship, a division more common in Japanese professional wrestling, since MLW already had a middleweight division. Also announced was a four-man single-elimination tournament that would culminate on June 1 with the crowning of the first champion. The tournament to crown the inaugural champion was later advertised on MLW Fusion, while being announced four wrestler to participate in the tournament, which was announced on May 4 by MLW Fusion'''s Executive Producer Salina de la Renta. The title was unveiled on May 17. On June 1 at Fury Road'', Alexander Hammerstone defeated Brian Pillman Jr. in the finals of the tournament to become the inaugural MLW National Openweight Champion.

Inaugural championship tournament

Reigns
Alexander Hammerstone was the inaugural champion. Hammerstone's reign is the longest at 865 days, while Davey Richards reign is the shortest at 198 days. John Hennigan was the oldest champion when he won it at 43 years old, while Alex Kane was the youngest champion at 28 years old. 

John Hennigan is the current champion in his first reign. He defeated Davey Richards at Blood and Thunder on January 7, 2023, in Philadelphia, PA.

References

External links
MLW National Openweight Title History at Cagematch.net

National Openweight
National professional wrestling championships
Openweight wrestling championships
2019 introductions